Klenovy Bulvar is a metro station on the Bolshaya Koltsevaya line of the Moscow Metro, between Kashirskaya and Nagatinsky Zaton. The name of the station derives from Klenovy Boulevard as it is located at the junction of between Kolomenskaya Street and Klenovy Boulevard. The station was opened on 1 March 2023. The construction started in 2017.

In 2027, the station is planned to have a transfer to the Biryulyovskaya line.

References

Moscow Metro stations
Railway stations in Russia opened in 2022
Bolshaya Koltsevaya line
Railway stations located underground in Russia